The Straitsmouth Island Light is a lighthouse located on Straitsmouth Island, in Rockport, Massachusetts. The original tower was built in 1835, and replaced by a second tower in 1896. It was automated in 1967, and is still in operation. The United States Coast Guard Light List description is "White cylindrical tower". The Light List name is "Straightsmouth Light", but the island is "Straitsmouth Island" on NOAA charts.

It was added to the National Register of Historic Places as the Straitsmouth Island Light in 1987.

Straitsmouth Island was owned for many years by the naval architect William Francis Gibbs and his wife, New York socialite and opera supporter, Vera Cravath Gibbs.

The island was left to the Massachusetts Audubon Society following the Gibbses' deaths in the 1960s.

See also
National Register of Historic Places listings in Essex County, Massachusetts

References

External links
NPS - Historic light stations - Straitsmouth Island Light
Rockport website

Lighthouses completed in 1835
Lighthouses completed in 1896
Lighthouses on the National Register of Historic Places in Massachusetts
Rockport, Massachusetts
Lighthouses in Essex County, Massachusetts
National Register of Historic Places in Essex County, Massachusetts